The walls and fortifications around Dublin were raised by the Ostmen in the 9th Century, and the majority of the cities in Ireland remained subject to incursions by native clans until the seventeenth century. The defences of Dublin would eventually fall into disrepair but continued to serve a purpose as late as 1762 when the auction of the rights to collect tolls at each of the then seven city gates raised £4,000 for the city.

Below is a list of the historic Gates of Dublin along the city's ancient boundaries:

References

Gates
Gates
Dublin
Gates
Dublin gates
Dublin Gates